School Lake is a lake in Brown County, Minnesota, in the United States. It is a 102-acre protected lake.

School Lake was named from its location in the school section 16.

See also
List of lakes in Minnesota
List of fishes of Minnesota

References

External links
School Lake Topographical map

Lakes of Minnesota
Lakes of Brown County, Minnesota